The Calgary Fire Department (CFD) provides fire services for the city of Calgary, Alberta.

The department was created on 25 August 1885 as the Calgary Hook, Ladder and Bucket Corps.

As of February 2022, the department has 42 stations. The departments employs over 1,500 personnel in both operational and support roles. Their headquarters is located at 4144 11th Street SE.

History 
The department was created on 25 August 1885 as the Calgary Hook, Ladder and Bucket Corps and a chemical engine was ordered soon after. The first Captain was George Constantine. Prior to the formation of the Corps, wells had been dug throughout the town in 1884 at the recommendation of George Murdoch, Mayor of the Town of Calgary. In November 1886, Calgary experienced a conflagration, which would become to be known as the Calgary Fire of 1886. Before the fire there was much disorder in the town due to both George Murdoch and James Riley claiming to be and acting as Mayor. This resulted in a slow response to the fire which can be attributed to the absence of a functioning local government. As neither George Murdoch or James Reilly was capable of effectively governing the town, the newly ordered chemical engine was held in the Canadian Pacific Railway storage yard due to lack of payment. Members of the department broke into the CPR storage yard on the day of the fire to retrieve the engine. Later that month a meeting was held which saw Steve Jarrett be elected as the first chief and Bob Ogburn as Assistant Chief. May 1887 saw the opening of Calgary's first fire hall: which had been recommended at the meeting in November 1886, and was approved by Town Council shortly after.

In 1887, following a disagreement between Town Council and the current fire brigade, current Chief Frank Dick and his members resigned. They sold their furniture at the fire hall and donated the proceeded to the hospital. Following the resignation of the brigade, the Mayor and Council proceeded to appoint a high salaried chief and organize a brigade. The new brigade consisted of the Mayor and Council and would-be fire-fighters. When it came to a serious fire, they weren't well organized and in a short time the citizens of Calgary were calling for the reinstatement of the old brigade.

The reinstatement occurred on 23 July 1889, when a meeting was held and a decision was agreed upon by the two bodies to have the regular brigade again take charge. The hall and appliances were accordingly turned over to the original brigade.

In January 1890 the brigade began to look to purchase band instruments. After receiving instruments, uniforms, music stands, etc. from a Mr. D. W. Marsh a band was organised. The band carried on with varied success under different leaders for a number of years.

In June 1897, a serious flood occurred and the department was called out to rescue residents on the water front. For their services the council gave the department Can$75 .

1901 saw the department hold its first church parade. New uniforms were purchased for the band at a cost of about Can$500. During the visit of the Duke and Duchess of York during this year, the department acted as a special police. They had their hall elaborately decorated but the Duke and Duchess did not see it.

Prior to 1909, it was a volunteer fire department.  In 1909, 40 full-time firefighters were hired.  In 1910, it purchased its first motorized fire truck.

Organization

Fire Suppression Staff

Chief Officers 
The Fire Service uses the term "Chief Officer" to describe individuals who are in a Chief role. These "Chief Officers" are responsible for overseeing management functions as well as supervising fire operations and other services. In the Calgary Fire Department, the Chief Officers are: 
 Fire Chief – One Chief Officer oversees the entire Calgary Fire Department (CFD)
 Deputy Chief/Manager – Five Chief Officers oversee the individual divisions of the CFD. These divisions are: 
 Fire Rescue Services (Deputy Chief)
 Fire Rescue Services Support (Deputy Chief)
 Risk Management (Deputy Chief)
 Administration and Infrastructure (Deputy Chief)
 Strategic Services (Manager)
  Assistant Deputy Chief – There are a number of Assistant Deputy Chiefs. Numerous Assistant Deputy Chiefs are tasked to Fire Rescue Services and the remainder of the Assistant Deputy Chiefs are deployed to other divisions where needed. 
 Battalion Chief – Firefighters work on a four platoon (shift) system (A, B, C, & D). Each platoon is overseen by a Battalion Chief, so in total there are four Battalion Chiefs. 
  District Chief – The city is divided into five districts (East, West, North, South, & Central). Each platoon within a district is supervised by a District Chief, therefore  there are 5 District Chiefs at any given time (one in each district) and 20 in total

Company officers 

Company officers are in charge of each crew. Company officers include: 
 Fire Captain – each fire engine (pumper truck) is supervised by a fire captain on each platoon. As there is an engine in each fire hall, the captain is in charge of the fire hall as well. 
 Fire Lieutenant – every other fire apparatus is supervised by a lieutenant. These include aerial trucks, rescue trucks, hazmat trucks, etc. Every hall has an engine, but only select halls have other apparatus, such as these.

Firefighters 
Firefighters are the main workforce of the fire department. They include: 
 Senior Firefighter – one on each Fire Engine (pumper truck)
 Firefighter – drive the trucks and ride in the back
 Probationary Firefighter – placed on Fire Engines as needed, ride in the back with the Senior Firefighter

Support Staff 
The Fire Department also relies on numerous Support Staff to fill various roles. 255 local, uniformed, support staff members are firefighters who have moved into a different role within the Department. The Fire Marshal oversees the inspectors and investigators within the division of Risk Management.
Each Support Section is also run by a Coordinator. These include:
 Hazardous Materials Coordinator
 Emergency Management Coordinator
 Technical Teams Coordinator 
 Recruitment Coordinator
 Fire Inspections Coordinator
 Fire Investigation Coordinator
 Wellness & Fitness Coordinator
 Health and Safety Coordinator
 Community Safety Coordinator
 Training Coordinator
 Medical Services Coordinator

Many Support Sections also have Staff Support Officers. These include: 
 Hazardous Materials Officers
 Emergency Management Officers
 Recruitment Officers
 Wellness & Fitness Officers
 Health and Safety Officers
 Community Safety Officers
 Fire Inspector II
 Fire Inspector I
 Technical Services Officers
 Public Information Officers
 Shift Investigator
 Training Officers
 Fire Investigator

The Fire Department also employs many other civilian staff in numerous roles.

Rank Insignia

Fire Suppression Staff

Emergency Medical Technician or Paramedic 
If a Firefighter, Company Officer, or Chief Officer is also qualified as a Primary Care Paramedic or Advanced Care Paramedic, they wear the Star of Life insignia on their fire helmet.

Support Staff

Helmet Colors

Fire Stations and Apparatus
There are 42 fire stations in Calgary, operating 24 hours a day.
Apparatus designations are denoted by the station number followed by the apparatus type.
Calgary International Airport Crash Rescue previously operated as CFD Station 13 until 1 June 2019, when the airport contracted firefighting services to Pro-Tec Fire Services of Canada.

References

External links
 Calgary Fire Department

Fire departments in Alberta
Politics of Calgary